Neptis ida, is a butterfly in the family Nymphalidae.

Subspecies
Neptis ida ida (southern Sulawesi)
Neptis ida carbonespersa Martin, 1924 (northern and central Sulawesi)
Neptis ida celebensis Hopffer, 1874 (North-eastern Sulawesi: Minahasa)
Neptis ida kalidupa Eliot, 1969 (Tukangbesi Islands)
Neptis ida liliputa Martin, 1924 (Butung, Muna, Kabaena)
Neptis ida saleyra Fruhstorfer, 1908 (Selajar)
Neptis ida sphaericus Fruhstorfer, 1907 (Sulawesi)

References

Butterflies described in 1858
ida
Endemic fauna of Indonesia